Belarmino Mário Chipongue (born 22 September 1974 in Lubango) is a former Angolan basketball player.

Chipongue, a forward, was part of the Angola national basketball team at the 2000 Summer Olympics and the 2002 FIBA World Championship.

See also
 Angola national basketball team

References

External links
 
 Sports-Reference Profile
 Basketball-Reference Profile
 RealGM Profile
 AfricaBasket Profile

1974 births
Living people
Angolan men's basketball players
Basketball players at the 2000 Summer Olympics
Olympic basketball players of Angola
People from Lubango
Atlético Petróleos de Luanda basketball players
Small forwards
2002 FIBA World Championship players